Mario Golf: Super Rush is a golf video game developed by Camelot Software Planning and published by Nintendo for the Nintendo Switch console. It was announced via a Nintendo Direct on February 17, 2021 and was released worldwide on June 25, 2021. It is the sixth installment in the Mario Golf series following Mario Golf: World Tour in 2014 and is part of the larger Mario franchise. The game features various characters from the Mario franchise competing in golf, with regular competition and other modes. 

Super Rush received mixed reviews from critics who praised the gameplay mechanics, new modes, controls, and visuals, but criticism was directed at the game's low amount of content at launch, while the adventure mode also received a mixed reaction.

Gameplay

The fundamental gameplay of Mario Golf: Super Rush is comparable to previous entries in the Mario Golf series. Through traditional golf rules, the player's primary objective is to get the ball into each hole with the fewest possible number of strokes, using the various golf clubs available to them. The player who completes the game with the lowest number of strokes is the winner of the match in the context of competition. Multiple tools are available to players for strategic benefit, such as the "Shot Gauge" showing the direction and the curve of the ball against slopes and the scan feature, which allows the player to better assess the elevation of terrain. The game offers both conventional button controls for taking shots and motion controls to simulate hitting the ball with a swing.

Speed Golf, a newly introduced mode for the Mario Golf series, has players race to complete courses in the fastest time, rather than with the fewest strokes. After each swing, players must run across the course toward their ball to take their next shot, dealing with other players and obstacles along the way. Each character in the game's roster has unique Special Shot and Special Dash abilities to take advantage of. For example, Luigi has the ability to freeze the ground. Another new mode called Battle Golf also makes its debut. Battle Golf resembles Speed Golf mechanically but differs in that it takes place on a special arena-course where players have to sink the ball in any 3 of the 9 open holes first to win.

Additionally, the game features a story mode titled "Golf Adventure" that includes role-playing game elements like gaining experience and stat progression. Players control their own customizable Mii as they become students in a country club, train, and face-off against classmates from the Mushroom Kingdom.

Development
Mario Golf: Super Rush is developed by Camelot Software Planning and published by Nintendo; the game was announced during a Nintendo Direct on February 17, 2021, and it was released worldwide on June 25 of the same year. The people that pre-ordered the game also received an exclusive pin set. Though not detailed in the initial game announcement, fans spotted that King Bob-omb, a boss that originally appeared in Super Mario 64, was accidentally mentioned by Nintendo to be a playable character on the official game page before being amended. King Bob-omb's inclusion was later officially revealed in an overview trailer alongside Pauline, Chargin' Chuck, and others.

Reception

Mario Golf: Super Rush received "mixed or average reviews" according to review aggregator Metacritic.

The Speed and Battle Golf modes were highly praised by critics and fans alike, with many calling it chaotic and a lot of fun. The game also received praise for its new gameplay mechanics and the added element of motion controls, the latter considered to be precise, as well as the visuals. It did, however, receive criticism for its lack of content, only launching with a few courses, characters and other features, although Nintendo promised that they will continue supporting the game with more content after launch.

The Golf Adventure mode received mixed reactions as well. Some were praising it for the open world and depth. Others, however, thought it was underwhelming and surprisingly short.

Mario Golf: Super Rush was the best-selling retail game during its first week on sale in Japan, with 80,430 physical copies being sold.

Notes

References

External links 
 

Camelot Software Planning games
Golf video games
Mario Golf
Nintendo Switch games
Nintendo Switch-only games
2021 video games
Video games developed in Japan
Multiplayer and single-player video games
Video games scored by Motoi Sakuraba
Interactive Achievement Award winners
D.I.C.E. Award for Sports Game of the Year winners